For the Saudi Road see: Trans-Arabian_Pipeline#Tapline_Road

The Petroleum Road or Tapline Road (Hebrew: כביש הנפט, Kvish HaNeft) is a privately owned north–south asphalt road in the Golan Heights. It begins near Mount Peres on the east edge of the central Golan, and ends in the northern Golan near the Israeli-occupied Golan-Lebanese frontier, nearby Ghajar.

Most of the road is marked on maps as inaccessible to traffic because of poor road quality.

The name Petroleum Road derives from the now defunct oil pipeline of the Trans-Arabian Pipeline Company, which the road runs adjacent to. The Tapline, as it is abbreviated, originated in the oil fields of Saudi Arabia, then proceeded through Jordan and Syria until reaching its oil export terminal in Sidon on the coast of Lebanon. Even though Israel came to control the section of the Tapline through the Golan after the 1967 Six-Day War it permitted its operation to continue. However, although it was the largest pipeline system in the world when it was completed in 1950, the Tapline had ceased all operations by 1990. The Golan Heights section stopped transporting petroleum in 1976.

Since the road diagonally bisects the entire length of the northern portion of the Golan Heights, it was the site of many battles fought along its axis during the Yom Kippur War in 1973.

The road
The southernmost 2 km were destroyed when Israel constructed its forward line of defensive fortifications opposite the ceasefire line between Israel and Syria after the Six-Day War. In addition, the northernmost 4 km is generally not considered part of the Petroleum Road, but is rather part of Route 999.

Since the Petroleum Road is a private road, not maintained by the Israeli transport authority, it has not been assigned a number.

Intersections on the route

Places of interest on the route
 Mount Paras
 Keshet Yehonatan Field School in Keshet
 Memorial monument for the IDF's 188th Armored Brigade
 Orvim creek nature reserve
 A view of Tel Faher, where the Golani Brigade fought a battle
 Banias archaeological site

References

External links
 TAPLINE

Golan Heights
Roads in Israeli-occupied territories